Camille Cogswell is a pastry and executive chef.

Career
A 2013 graduate of the The Culinary Institute of America at Hyde Park, her first job was at Brooklyn Fair for pastry chef Alex Grunert.

When Cogswell won the James Beard Award and Food & Wine award, she was the executive chef at K'Far and executive pastry chef at Zahav, both in Philadelphia. She joined them in 2015 but was let go by the parent company in 2020.

She owns Walnut Farm Bakery in Marshall, North Carolina.

Awards and honors
Food & Wine named Cogswell as one of the Best New Chefs in 2020 and in 2018, she was the James Beard Rising Str Chef of the Year.

References

Pastry chefs
American women chefs
Culinary Institute of America Hyde Park alumni
American women restaurateurs
American restaurateurs
James Beard Foundation Award winners
Chefs from North Carolina